is a city in Hyōgo Prefecture, Japan. , the city had an estimated population of 39,628 in 17199 households and a population density of 250 persons per km².

Geography 
Katō is located slightly south of central Hyogo Prefecture in the Harima region of the prefecture. The Kakogawa River and many of its tributaries flow through the city. Part of the city is within the borders of the Kiyomizu-Tōjōko-Tachikui Prefectural Natural Park.

Neighbouring municipalities 
Hyōgo Prefecture
 Nishiwaki
 Miki
 Ono
 Sanda
 Kasai
 Sasayama

Climate
Kasai has a Humid subtropical climate (Köppen Cfa) characterized by warm summers and cool winters with light to no snowfall.  There is a relatively warm climate throughout the four seasons. There are few disasters caused by typhoons and snowfall, and the average annual temperature is slightly lower than the coastal area of the Seto Inland Sea, but the amount of precipitation is slightly higher.

Demographics
Per Japanese census data, the population of Katō has remained relatively steady over the past 40 years.

History
The area of the modern city of Katō was within ancient Harima Province. During the Edo Period, the region was divided into a mosaic of small holdings by various feudal domains, with large portions held by Ono and Himeji Domains, Hamamatsu Domain and Tanakura Domain. The jin'ya of the minor Mikusa Domain was located in Katō. Following the Meiji restoration, the villages of  Takino and  Yashiro were created within Katō District with the establishment of the modern municipalities system on April 1, 1889. Yashiro was elevated to town status on June 1, 1912 followed by Takino on April 1, 1925. The city of Katō, which now occupies the northern two-thirds of former Katō District was established on March 20, 2006 from the merger of Takino and Yashiro with the town of  Tōjō.

Government
Katō has a mayor-council form of government with a directly elected mayor and a unicameral city council of 18 members. Katō contributes one member to the Hyogo Prefectural Assembly. In terms of national politics, the city is part of Hyōgo 4th district of the lower house of the Diet of Japan.

Economy
Katō is a regional commercial center, with a mixed local economy of agriculture and light manufacturing.

Education
Katō has seven public elementary schools, two public middle schools and one public combined elementary/middle school operated by the city government and one public high school operated by the Hyōgo Prefectural Department of Education. The prefecture also operates one special education school for the handicapped. The Hyogo University of Teacher Education is located in Katō and also operates its own high school.

Transportation

Railway 
 JR West - Kakogawa Line
  - -

Highways 
  Chūgoku Expressway

International relations

Twin towns – Sister cities
Katō is twinned with:
  Olympia, Washington, United States

Local attractions
Chōkō-ji, Buddhist temple with National Treasure Main Hall
Kiyomiu-dera (Katō), 25th temple on the Saigoku Kannon Pilgrimage
LakeTōjō

Sports facilities
 Greenhill Stadium, a baseball stadium in Katō, Hyōgo

Noted people from Kato
Keiji Shibazaki, admiral in the Imperial Japanese Navy

References

External links

Katō City official website 

Cities in Hyōgo Prefecture
Katō, Hyōgo